Ian Graham Payne (born 22 March 1947) is a former Australian rules footballer who played with Essendon in the Victorian Football League (VFL). 

Payne won the reserves best and fairest in 1965. Payne missed the 1968 season and the first half of the 1969 because he was conscripted to fight in the Vietnam War. He later played for Sunshine and Keilor.

Payne's brother, Charlie Payne, also played for Essendon.

Notes

External links 

Ian Payne's playing statistics from The VFA Project
Essendon Football Club past player profile

1947 births
Living people
Australian rules footballers from Victoria (Australia)
Essendon Football Club players
Terang Football Club players
Sunshine Football Club (VFA) players
Keilor Football Club players